Hydraulic lift may refer to:
 A type of hydraulic machinery
 Hydraulic elevator
 A form of hydraulic redistribution, a plant phenomenon